Buta Airways is an Azerbaijani low-cost virtual carrier headquartered in Baku, with its primary operational base at Heydar Aliyev International Airport. It is a fully owned subsidiary of Azerbaijan Airlines.

History
In December 2016, it was announced that Azerbaijan Airlines would set up its own in-house, low-cost airline named AZALJet. After a year of operation, it was decided that AZALJet would be replaced by a new airline named Buta Airways, which would have fleet of two Embraer aircraft in its own livery, operated by its own staff and with an independent tariff policy.

On 2 June 2017, the airline's livery and logo were approved. The logo reflects the symbolism of the mythological sacred bird Simurg, represented in the form of the Azerbaijani ornament buta. On the aircraft's aft and forward section, buta patterns are drawn in blue, which represents the airline's ties with Azerbaijan Airlines, and also in a bright red, which refers to Azerbaijan's flag.

In June, 2017, the airline announced that its minimum airfare for a one way journey will start at 29 euros. Despite being a low-cost airline, Buta Airways offers free sandwiches and water on board for all customers. Passengers can purchase additional services including baggage, hot meals and seat selection at an additional cost.

On 16 January 2018, Buta Airways began its first service to a destination within Europe, with a once weekly service to Sofia. Later that year in December, Buta Airways welcomed its eighth Embraer 190 jet.

In 2019, Buta Airways added Batumi, Ufa and Odesa to make 18 destinations for the airline.

Destinations

As of January 2019, Buta Airways plans to fly to 18 destinations, in 7 countries.

Fleet

As of October 2019, the Buta Airways fleet consists of the following aircraft:

References

External links
 

Airlines of Azerbaijan
Azerbaijani brands
Airlines established in 2016
Companies based in Baku
Low-cost carriers